The Only Garden is an EP by the Japanese visual kei band Exist Trace, released on July 29, 2020 with six tracks. It is the band's first release since the Royal Straight Magic EP in 2016.

Overview 
Exist Trace said that is their first recorded album without all the members being together all the time, due to the COVID-19 pandemic. Miko, the guitarist, said the cover represents the blood of the members soaked into a rose.

Track listing

Personnel 
 Jyou - singing
 Omi - guitar
 Miko - guitar
 Naoto - bass
 Mally - drums

References

Exist Trace albums
Rock EPs
Japanese-language EPs
2020 EPs